Prinsepia is a genus of trees in the Rosaceae. It bears fruit which looks like a cherry.

The plant is named for James Prinsep, scholar, antiquarian, architect, secretary of the Asiatic Society in Calcutta, India, and member of the well-known Prinsep family of India, an Anglo-Indian family prominent in Indian affairs for several generations.

References

Exochordeae
Rosaceae genera